Leonard Duns (28 September 1916 – 29 April 1989) was an English footballer who played for Sunderland as outside right. He was born in Newcastle Upon Tyne, England.

Club career
Duns made his debut for Sunderland on 2 November 1935 in a 2–2 tie against Portsmouth at Fratton Park. In the first five games in the 1937 Cup run, Duns scored at least once, and by the age of 21 he had won both the FA cup and the league championship. He also won the 1936 FA Charity Shield. In his career at Sunderland, he made 248 appearances and scored 54 goals.

References

1916 births
1989 deaths
English footballers
Footballers from Newcastle upon Tyne
Sunderland A.F.C. players
Brentford F.C. wartime guest players
Association football forwards
FA Cup Final players